Ten Mile Creek Bridge or Tenmile Creek Bridge may refer to:

Ten Mile Creek Bridge (Iowa), listed at National Register of Historic Places listings in Winneshiek County, Iowa
Ten Mile Creek Bridge (Oregon), listed on the NRHP in Oregon